Psecas is a genus of jumping spiders that was first described by Carl Ludwig Koch in 1850.

Species
 it contains fourteen species, found only in South America, Panama, and on Trinidad:
Psecas bacelarae Caporiacco, 1947 – Guyana
Psecas barbaricus (Peckham & Peckham, 1894) – Trinidad
Psecas bubo (Taczanowski, 1871) – Guyana
Psecas chapoda (Peckham & Peckham, 1894) – Brazil
Psecas chrysogrammus (Simon, 1901) – Peru, Brazil
Psecas cyaneus (C. L. Koch, 1846) (type) – Suriname
Psecas euoplus Chamberlin & Ivie, 1936 – Panama
Psecas jaguatirica Mello-Leitão, 1941 – Colombia
Psecas pulcher Badcock, 1932 – Paraguay
Psecas rubrostriatus Schmidt, 1956 – Colombia
Psecas sumptuosus (Perty, 1833) – Panama to Argentina
Psecas vellutinus Mello-Leitão, 1948 – Guyana
Psecas viridipurpureus (Simon, 1901) – Brazil
Psecas zonatus Galiano, 1963 – Brazil

References

External links
 

Salticidae genera
Salticidae
Spiders of Central America
Spiders of South America
Taxa named by Carl Ludwig Koch